Heteromydas is a genus of mydas flies in the family Mydidae. There are at least two described species in Heteromydas.

Species
These two species belong to the genus Heteromydas:
 Heteromydas bicolor Hardy, 1944 i c g b
 Heteromydas chrysites (Osten Sacken, 1886) c g
Data sources: i = ITIS, c = Catalogue of Life, g = GBIF, b = Bugguide.net

References

Further reading

 

Mydidae
Articles created by Qbugbot
Asiloidea genera